Pampanga, officially the Province of Pampanga, is a province in the Central Luzon region of the Philippines. Lying on the northern shore of Manila Bay, Pampanga is bordered by Tarlac to the north, Nueva Ecija to the northeast, Bulacan to the east, Manila Bay to the central-south, Bataan to the southwest and Zambales to the west. Its capital is the City of San Fernando. Angeles City is the largest LGU, but while geographically within Pampanga, it is classified as a first-class, highly urbanized city and has been governed independently of the province since it received its charter in 1964.

The name La Pampanga was given by the Spaniards, who encountered natives living along the banks (pampáng) of the Pampanga River. Its creation in 1571 makes it the first Spanish province on Luzon Island (Cebu in Visayas is older as it was founded by the Spaniards in 1565). The town of Villa de Bacolor in the province briefly served as the Spanish colonial capital when Great Britain invaded Manila as part of the Seven Years' War. At the eve of the Philippine Revolution of 1896, Pampanga was one of eight provinces placed under martial law for rebellion against the Spanish Empire; it is thus represented on the Philippine national flag as one of the eight rays of the sun.

The province is home to two Philippine Air Force airbases: Basa Air Base in Floridablanca and the former United States Clark Air Base in Angeles. Due to its growing population and developments, the Clark Global City is now developed and is located in Clark Freeport Zone. In 2015, the province had 2,198,110 inhabitants, while it had 1,079,532 registered voters.

History

Pampanga during the Philippine colonial era 

Ancient Pampanga's Territorial area included portions of the modern provinces of Tarlac, Bataan, Zambales, Nueva Ecija, Bulacan, Aurora, and Quezon, i.e. covered almost the entire Central Luzon. Pampanga was re-organized as a province by the Spaniards on December 11, 1571. For better administration and taxation purposes, the Spanish authorities subdivided Pampanga into pueblos, which were further subdivided into districts (barrios) and in some cases into royal and private estates (encomiendas).

Due to excessive abuses committed by some encomenderos, King Philip II of Spain in 1574 prohibited the further awarding of private estates, but this decree was not fully enforced until 1620. In a report of Philippine encomiendas on June 20, 1591, Governor-General Gómez Pérez Dasmariñas reported to the Crown that La Pampanga's encomiendas were Bataan, Betis y Lubao, Macabebe, Candaba, Apalit, Calumpit, Malolos, Binto, Guiguinto, Caluya, Bulacan and Mecabayan. The encomiendas of La Pampanga at that time had eighteen thousand six hundred and eighty whole tributes.

During the Spanish regime it was one of the richest Philippine provinces. Manila and its surrounding region were then primarily dependent on Kapampangan agricultural, fishery and forestry products as well as on the supply of skilled workers. As other Luzon provinces were created due to increases in population, some well-established Pampanga towns were lost to new emerging provinces in Central Luzon.

During the 17th century, The Dutch recruited men from Pampanga as mercenaries who served the Royal Netherlands East Indies Army, known as Papangers part of the larger Mardijkers community. Their legacy can be found in North Jakarta, however, there are few traces of their descendants, except for a small community in Kampung Tugu.

The historic province of Bataan which was founded in 1754 under the administration of Spanish Governor-General Pedro Manuel Arandia, absorbed from the province of Pampanga the municipalities of Abucay, Balanga (now a city), Dinalupihan, Llana Hermosa, Orani, Orion, Pilar, and Samal.

During the British occupation of Manila (1762–1764), Bacolor became the provisional Spanish colonial capital and military base.

The old Pampanga towns of Aliaga, Cabiao, Gapan, San Antonio and San Isidro were ceded to the province of Nueva Ecija in 1848 during the term of Spanish Governor-General Narciso Claveria y Zaldua. The municipality of San Miguel de Mayumo of Pampanga was yielded to the province of Bulacan in the same provincial boundary configuration in 1848.

In 1860, the northern towns of Bamban, Capas, Concepcion, Victoria, Tarlac, Mabalacat, Magalang, Porac and Floridablanca were separated from Pampanga and were placed under the jurisdiction of a military command called Comandancia Militar de Tarlac. However, in 1873, the four latter towns were returned to Pampanga and the other five became municipalities of the newly created Province of Tarlac.

On December 8, 1941, Japanese planes bombed Clark Air Base marking the beginning of the invasion of Pampanga. Between 1941 and 1942, occupying Japanese forces began entering Pampanga.

During the counter-insurgencies under the Japanese occupation from 1942 to 1944, Kapampangan guerrilla fighters and the Hukbalahap Communist guerrillas fought side by side in the province of Pampanga, attacking and retreating the Japanese Imperial forces for over three years of fighting and invasion.

The establishment of the military general headquarters and military camp bases of the Philippine Commonwealth Army was active from 1935 to 1946. The Philippine Constabulary was active from 1935 to 1942 and 1944 to 1946 in the province of Pampanga. During the military engagements of the anti-Japanese Imperial military operations in central Luzon from 1942 to 1945 in the province of Bataan, Bulacan, Northern Tayabas (now Aurora), Nueva Ecija, Pampanga, Tarlac, and Zambales, the local guerrilla resistance fighters and Hukbalahap Communist guerrillas, helped the U.S. military forces fight the Imperial Japanese armed forces.

In the 1945 liberation of Pampanga, Kapampangan guerrilla fighters and the Hukbalahap Communist guerrillas supported combat forces from Filipino and American ground troops in attacking Japanese Imperial forces during the Battle of Pampanga until the end of the Second World War. Local military operations soldiers and officers of the Philippine Commonwealth Army 2nd, 26th, 3rd, 32nd, 33rd, 35th, 36th and 37th Infantry Division and the Philippine Constabulary 3rd Constabulary Regiment recaptured and liberated the province of Pampanga and fought against the Japanese Imperial forces during the Battle of Pampanga.

Pampanga during the Postwar era 

After the Second World War, operations in the main province of Pampanga was downfall insurgencies and conflicts between the Philippine Government forces and the Hukbalahap Communist rebels on 1946 to 1954 during the Hukbalahap Rebellion.

Pampanga during the Marcos martial law era 

During the Marcos dictatorship, thousands of Kapampangans were tortured and murdered by the Marcos regime through various means such as rape, forced stripping, electric shocks, beatings, and genital mutilations, among many others. Kapampangan religious leaders rose up against Marcos until the People Power Revolution occurred, where a Kapampangan, Corazon Aquino, became president.

Among the most prominent of these victims were the Sapang Bato martyrs - Claro Cabrera, Rolando Castro and Pepito Deheran - who were victims of ‘salvaging’ - the term used as a time for summary executions. The three were members of the Concerned Citizens of Pampanga, a cause-oriented group that denounced the human rights abuses of the martial law regime, and had campaigned for a boycott of the 1984 Batasang Pambansa election, which the opposition regarded as a Marcos ploy to pacify the Philippines' growing protest movement. The three were abducted by Marcos' soldiers shortly after the elections, and brought to a military camp where they were interrogated, beaten and stabbed. The three were left for dead on the banks of the Apalit river, where Castro and Cabrera's bodies were discovered later. However, Deheran survived, and was able to name two of their attackers before he was attacked again and killed at the hospital where he had been brought to recuperate.

Another prominent early case was that of Holy Angel College instructor and former Jesuit seminarian Teresito "Terry" Sison, whose founding of the Salaginto Dramatic Guild and performance of socially relevant plays led to his being attacked by a local private army who called themselves the Monkees, and for his eventual capture by Marcos' soldiers in 1971, when Marcos had suspended the Writ of Habeas Corpus as a test-run for Martial Law in 1971. Terry, a diabetic, was tortured at Camp Crame using methods including the burning of the soles of his feet using a hot iron.  Sustaining liver damage due to his torture, he died on National Heroes day, on November 30, 1980.

Cabrera, Castro, Deheran, and Sison are all honored at the Philippines' Bantayog ng mga Bayani, which honors the martyrs and heroes who fought against Marcos' authoritarian regime.

Contemporary history 
The June 15, 1991, eruption of Mount Pinatubo displaced a large number of people with the submersion of whole towns and villages by massive lahar floods. This led to a large-scale advancement in disaster preparation in government. In 2010, a Kapampangan, Benigno Aquino III, son of former President Corazon Aquino, was elected as president.

On April 22, 2019, the province suffered severe damage due to 6.1 magnitude earthquake which originated from Zambales and was the most affected area by the earthquake due to province sitting on soft sediment and alluvial soil. Several structures in the province were damaged by the quake, including a 4-story supermarket in Porac, the Bataan-Pampanga boundary arch and the main terminal of Clark International Airport, as well as old churches in Lubao and Porac, where the stone bell tower of the 19th-century Santa Catalina de Alejandria Church collapsed.

Geography
Pampanga covers a total area of  occupying the south-central section of the Central Luzon region. The province is bordered by Tarlac to the north, Nueva Ecija to the northeast, Bulacan to the east, Manila Bay to the central-south, Bataan to the southwest, and Zambales to the northwest.

Its terrain is relatively flat with one distinct mountain, Mount Arayat and the notable Pampanga River. Santo Tomas, with an area of only , is the smallest.

Climate
The province of Pampanga has two distinct climates, rainy and dry. The rainy or wet season normally begins in May and runs through October, while the rest of the year is the dry season. The warmest period of the year occurs between March and April, while the coolest period is from December through February. The wet season will be from June to October and also dry season
will be from November to April in the province of Pampanga.

Administrative divisions
Pampanga comprises 19 municipalities and three cities (one highly urbanized and two component).

Demographics

Population
The native inhabitants of Pampanga are generally referred to as the Kapampangans (alternatively Pampangos or Pampangueños).

Languages

The whole population of Pampanga speak Kapampangan, which is one of the Central Luzon languages along with the Sambalic languages. English and Tagalog are rather spoken and used as secondary languages. There are a few Sambal speakers in the province, especially near the border of Zambales.

Religion

The province of Pampanga is composed of many religious groups, but it is predominantly Roman Catholic (88.92%).

According to 2010 Census, other prominent Christian groups include the Iglesia ni Cristo (3.84%), Evangelicals (1.34%), Aglipayan Church (0.60%), Jesus is Lord Church (0.48%), Baptist Church (0.39%), Jehovah’s Witnesses (0.27%), Church of Christ (0.23%), United Church of Christ in the Philippines (0.22%), Seventh-day Adventist Church (0.18%) and many others.

Islam (0.017%) is also present in the province, mainly due to migrants originating from the south, as well as Buddhism, which is practiced by a few people of Chinese descent.

Economy

Farming and fishing are the two main industries. Major products include rice, corn, sugarcane, and tilapia. Pampanga is the tilapia capital of the country because of its high production reaching 214,210.12 metric tons in 2015. In addition to farming and fishing, the province supports thriving cottage industries that specialize in wood carving, furniture making, guitars and handicrafts. Every Christmas season, the province of Pampanga, especially in the capital city of San Fernando becomes the center of a thriving industry centered on handcrafted lighted lanterns called parols that display a kaleidoscope of light and color. Other industries include its casket industry and the manufacturing of all-purpose vehicles in the municipality of Santo Tomas.

The province is famous for its sophisticated culinary work: it is called the “food capital” of the Philippines. Kapampangans are well known for their culinary creations. Famous food products range from the mundane to the exotic. Roel's Meat Products, Pampanga's Best and Mekeni Food are among the better known meat brands of the country producing Kapampangan favorites such as pork and chicken tocinos, beef tapa, hotdogs, longganizas (Philippine-style cured sausages) and chorizos.

Specialty foods such as the siopao, pandesal, tutong, lechon (roasted pig) and its sarsa (sauce) are popular specialty foods in the region. The more exotic betute tugak (stuffed frog), kamaru (mole crickets) cooked adobo, bulanglang (pork cooked in guava juice), lechon kawali and bringhe (a green sticky rice dish like paella) are a mainstay in Kapampangan feasts.

Native sweets and delicacies like pastillas, turonnes de casuy, buro, are the most sought after by Filipinos including a growing number of tourists who enjoy authentic Kapampangan cuisine. The famous cookie in Mexico, Pampanga, Panecillos de San Nicolas, which is known as the mother of all Philippine cookies, is made here, famously made by Lillian Borromeo.  The cookies are made with arrowroot, sugar, coconut milk and butter and are blessed in Catholic parishes every year on the feast of San Nicolas Tolentino.  The cookies are believed to have a healing power and bestow good luck and are sometimes crumbled into rice fields before planting.

Tourism is a growing industry in the province of Pampanga. Clark Freeport Zone is home to Clark International Airport, designated as the Philippines' future premier gateway. Other developing industries include semiconductor manufacturing for electronics and computers mostly located within the freeport.

Within the Clark Special Economic Zone are well-established hotels and resorts. Popular tourist destinations include St. Peter Shrine in Apalit, Mt. Arayat National Park in San Juan Bano, Mount Arayat, the Paskuhan Village in the City of San Fernando, the Casino Filipino in Angeles and, for nature and wildlife, "Paradise Ranch and Zoocobia Fun Zoo" in Clark. Well-known annual events include the Giant Lantern Festival in December, the hot air balloon festival in Clarkfield in February and in Lubao in April, the San Pedro Cutud Lenten Rites celebrated two days before Easter, and the Aguman Sanduk in Minalin celebrated on the afternoon of New Year's Day.

Boat culture

There have been proposals to revitalize the karakoa shipbuilding tradition of the Kapampangan people in recent years. The karakoa was the warship of the Kapampangan from the classical eras (before 15th century) up to the 16th century. The production of the karakoa and its usage were stopped by the Spanish colonialists to establish the galleon ship-making tradition instead, as a sign of Spanish dominance over the Kapampangan.

Infrastructure

Telecommunication
Telephone services are provided by PLDT, Digitel, Converge Telecom, Datelcom, the Evangelista Telephone Company, and the Pampanga Telecom Company in the town of Macabebe. The province has 24 public telegraph offices distributed among its towns while the facilities of PT&T and RCPI were set up to serve the business centers in Angeles, San Fernando City and Guagua.

Several Internet Service provider are available. These include the Angeles Computer Network Specialist, Information Resources Network System, Inc., [Mosaic communications Inc., Net Asia Angeles, Phil World On Line and Comclark Network and Technology Corp.

United Parcel Service (UPS) and Federal Express (FedEx) provide international courier services. Their hubs are in the Clark Freeport Zone. They are complemented by four local couriers operating as the communication and baggage of the province. There are three postal district offices and 35 post office stations distributed in the 20 municipalities and two cities of the province.

Water and power

Potable water supply in the province reaches the populace through three levels namely: Level I (point source system), Level II (communal faucet system), and Level III (individual connections). A well or spring is the pinpointed water source in areas where houses are few as the system is only designed to serve 15 to 25 households. As of 1997, there were 128,571 Level I water system users in the province.  The communal faucet system (Level II) serves the rural areas while the Level III system is managed by the Local Water Utilities Administration (LWUA). The system provides individual house connections to all second and first class private subdivisions.

Electric power is distributed to the majority of the towns through the distribution centers of the Pampanga Electric Cooperative (PELCO) which include PELCO I, II, III. Small parts of Candaba and Macabebe are also supplied by Manila Electric Company (Meralco). Angeles and small parts of Mabalacat are supplied by Angeles Electric Corporation (AEC) Villa de Bacolor, Guagua, Sta, Rita, Lubao, Sasmuan, Porac, Mabalacat and small part of Floridablanca are supplied by Pampanga Electric Cooperative II (PELCO II). City of San Fernando and Floridablanca is supplied by San Fernando Electric Company (SFELAPCO).

Power is also transmitted to the province through various transmission lines and substations located within the province, such as the Mexico and Clark substations, and Hermosa–Duhat–Balintawak, Mexico–Hermosa, Hermosa–San Jose transmission lines, etc., all of which are operated and maintained by the National Grid Corporation of the Philippines (NGCP).

Transportation
The province of Pampanga is strategically located at the crossroads of central Luzon and is highly accessible by air and land. The province is home to two airstrips: Basa Air Base in Floridablanca, which is used by the military, and Clark International Airport in Clark Freeport Zone. Pampanga has five municipal ports that function as fish landing centers. These are in the municipalities of Guagua, Macabebe, Masantol, Minalin, and Sasmuan.

Road transport
Land travel to Pampanga is provided by highways and by buses. Buses that travel the routes of Manila-Bataan, Manila-Zambales, Manila-Tarlac, Manila-Nueva Ecija, Manila-Bulacan-Pampanga, and Manila-Pampanga-Dagupan serve as connections with the nearby provinces and Metro Manila.

The  North Luzon Expressway (NLEX) extends from Balintawak in Quezon City, Metro Manila, to Santa Ines in Mabalacat. It passes through the cities and municipalities of Apalit, San Simon, Santo Tomas, San Fernando, Mexico, Angeles City, and ends on Santa Ines in Mabalacat.

The  four-lane Subic–Clark–Tarlac Expressway (SCTEx) to date, is the longest toll expressway in the Philippines. Its southern terminus is in the Subic Bay Freeport Zone and passes through the Clark Freeport Zone in two interchanges: Clark North and Clark South. The expressway is linked to the North Luzon Expressway through the Mabalacat Interchange. Its northern terminus is located at the Central Techno Park in Tarlac City, Tarlac.

Aside from the expressways, national highways also serve the province. Two major national highways serves Pampanga, the MacArthur Highway (N2) and Jose Abad Santos Avenue (N3). Secondary and tertiary national roads, and provincial roads complement the highway backbone.

Schools

Colleges and universities

 AIE College 
 AMA Computer College (Angeles)
 AMA Computer College (City of San Fernando)
 AMA Computer Learning Center (Angeles)
 AMA Computer Learning Center (City of San Fernando)
 AMA Computer Learning Center (Apalit)
 Angeles University Foundation 
 Arayat Institute (Arayat)
 Arayat National High School (Arayat)
 Asian College of Science & Technology
 Asian Institute of Computer Studies (Mabalacat City and City of San Fernando)
 Center for Asian Culinary Studies 
 Central Luzon College of Science and Technology (CELTECH College), 
 City College of Angeles 
 Church Education System Seminary & Institute of Religion, in every chapels of the Church of Jesus Christ of Latter-day Saints
 Colegio de San Lorenzo de Pampanga 
 Colegio de Sebastian 
 Computer System Specialist, Inc. 
 Dau Academy-Saint Muchen (Mabalacat City)
 Dee Hwa Liong College Foundation (Mabalacat City)
 Development for Advanced Technology Achievement (DATA) College 
 Don Honorio Ventura State University (Bacolor)
 Don Honorio Ventura State University (Candaba)
 Don Honorio Ventura State University (Lubao)
 Don Honorio Ventura State University (Mexico)
 Don Honorio Ventura State University (Porac)
 Don Honorio Ventura State University (Santo Tomas)
 East Central Colleges 
 Exact College of Asia (Arayat)
 Gateway Institute of Science and Technology 
 Gonzalo Puyat School of Arts and Trades (San Luis)
 Guagua National Colleges (Guagua)
 Harvardian Colleges 
 Holy Angel University 
 Holy Cross College Pampanga (Santa Ana)
 Infant Jesus Academy (IJA)
 Information and Communication Technology High School 
 Integrated Computer School Foundation 
 International School for Culinary Arts and Hotel Management 
 Jocson College 
 Jose C. Feliciano College, Inc. (Mabalacat City)
 La Plata Science and Technology, Inc. 
 La Verdad Christian College (Apalit)
 Mabalacat College (Mabalacat City)
 Mary Help of Christians School Inc. (Mabalacat City)
 Mary the Queen College (Guagua)
 Mega Computer College 
 Megabyte College of Science and Technology (Floridablanca and Guagua)
 Mother of Good Counsel Major Seminary 
 Mother of Good Counsel Minor Seminary 
 Mother of Perpetual Help Institute School of Midwifery and Nursing Aide 
 Mount Carmel Colleges 
 New Era University 
 NorthPoint Academy for Culinary Arts 
 Our Lady of Fatima University 
 Pampanga Colleges (Macabebe)
 Pampanga Institute (Masantol)
 Pampanga State Agricultural University (Magalang)
 Philippine State College of Aeronautics (Floridablanca)
 Proverbsville School (Angeles City)
 Proverbsville School (City of San Fernando)
 Republic Central Colleges 
 Saint Anthony College of Technology (Mabalacat City)
 Saint Mary's Angels College of Pampanga (Santa Ana)
 Saint Michael's College (Guagua)
 St. Nicolas College of Business and Technology (City of San Fernando)
 San Lorenzo Ruiz Center of Studies and Schools 
 Santa Rita College Integrated School (Santa Rita)
 Somascan Fathers Seminary (Lubao)
 Saint Augustine School of Nursing 
 St. Scholastica’s Academy 
 STI College (Angeles City)
 STI College 
 Systems Plus College Foundation, Inc. 
 Systems Plus College Foundation, Inc. 
 TESDA Training Center 
 The Metropolitan Academy of Arts & Beauty – Pampanga 
 University of the Assumption 
 University of the Philippines - Diliman Extension Program in Pampanga (Clark Freeport Zone)

Government and politics
Like other provinces in the Philippines, Pampanga is governed by a governor and vice governor who are elected to three-year terms. The governor is the executive head and leads the province's departments in executing the ordinances and improving public services. The vice governor heads a legislative council (Sangguniang Panlalawigan) consisting of board members from the districts.

Provincial government

Just as the national government, the provincial government is divided into three branches: executive, legislative, and judiciary. The judicial branch is administered solely by the Supreme Court of the Philippines. The LGUs have control of the executive and legislative branches.

The executive branch is composed of the governor for the province, mayors for the cities and municipalities, and the barangay captains for the barangays. The provincial assembly for the provinces, Sangguniang Panlungsod (city assembly) for the cities, Sangguniang Bayan (town assembly) for the municipalities, Sangguniang Barangay (barangay council), and the Sangguniang Kabataan for the youth sector.

The seat of government is vested upon the governor and other elected officers who hold office at the Provincial Capitol building. The Sangguniang Panlalawigan is the center of legislation.

Court system
The Supreme Court of the Philippines recognizes Pampanga regional trial courts and metropolitan or municipal trial courts within the province and towns, that have an overall jurisdiction in the populace of the province and towns, respectively.

Batas Pambansa Blg. 129, "The Judiciary Reorganization Act of 1980", as amended, created Regional, Metropolitan, Municipal Trial and Circuit Courts. The Third Judicial Region includes RTCs in Bulacan, Nueva Ecija, Pampanga, Palayan and San Jose, inter alia:
xxx. There shall be – (c) Seventy-five Regional Trial judges shall be commissioned for the Third Judicial Region: Twenty-two branches (Branches XLI to LXII) for the province of Pampanga and the city of Angeles, Branches XLI to XLVIII with seats at San Fernando, Branches XLIX to LIII at Guagua, Branches LIV and LV at Macabebe, and Branches LVI to LXII at Angeles;

The law also created Metropolitan Trial Court in each metropolitan area established by law, a Municipal Trial Court in each of the other cities or municipalities, and a Municipal Circuit Trial Court in each circuit comprising such cities and/or municipalities as are grouped together pursuant to law: three branches for Cabanatuan; in every city which does not form part of a metropolitan area, there shall be a Municipal Trial Court with one branch, except as hereunder provided: Three branches for Angeles;

In each of the municipalities that are not comprised within a metropolitan area and a municipal circuit there shall be a Municipal Trial Court which shall have one branch, except as hereunder provided: Four branches for San Fernando and two branches for Guagua, both of Pampanga.

Provincial Government
The Provincial government is composed of a Governor as the Local Chief Executive of the Province, Vice-Governor and Members of the Sangguniang Panlalawigan.

Governor 
Governor Dennis "Delta" G. Pineda (NPC)

Vice-Governor 
Vice-Governor Lilia Pineda (Kambilan)

Members of the Sangguniang Panlalawigan

Mayor

Notable people

National heroes and historical personalities 

 José Alejandrino - born in Arayat, Philippine Revolutionary General and former senator.
 Mamerto Natividad - born in Bacolor, Philippine Revolutionary General.
 Servillano Aquino - Philippine Revolutionary General and member of Malolos Congress for Samar
 Nicolasa Dayrit Panlilio - Filipina non-combatant in the Philippine–American War known for  helping to minister the sick and wounded Filipino combatants.
 Práxedes Fajardo – Filipina revolutionary and head of the Pampangan section of the Philippine Red Cross during the anticolonial armed struggles against Spain and the United States.
 José Abad Santos – born in San Fernando, Pampanga, the 5th chief justice of the Supreme Court of the Philippines.
 Pedro Abad Santos – a former assemblyman and founder of the Aguman ding Talapagobra ning Pilipinas.
 Luis Taruc – leader of the Hukbalahap group (from Hukbong Bayan Laban sa Hapon) between 1942 and 1950.
 Casto Alejandrino – peasant leader and commander of the Hukbalahap.
 Vivencio Cuyugan – former  mayor of San Fernando, and one of the founders of the guerrilla group Hukbalahap

Politics and Government

 Diosdado Pangan Macapagal – 9th president of the Republic of the Philippines and a native of Lubao, Pampanga.
 Gloria Macapagal Arroyo – 14th president of the Republic of the Philippines. She is the daughter of the 9th president of the Republic Diosdado Macapagal.
 Rogelio dela Rosa – former Philippine senator and actor, native of Lubao, Pampanga.
 Pablo Ángeles y David – former Philippine senator and former Governor of Pampanga
 Sotero Baluyut – former Philippine senator and former Governor of Pampanga
Antonio Villa-Real – 25th Associate Justice of the Supreme Court of the Philippines
Vicente Abad Santos – 96th Associate Justice of the Supreme Court of the Philippines, 39th Secretary of the Department of Justice
 Amando Tetangco, Jr. – born in Apalit, Pampanga is a Filipino banker, who served as the third Governor of the Bangko Sentral ng Pilipinas (BSP). He was the first BSP governor to serve two terms. 
 Jose Lingad – former Governor of Pampanga and  15th Secretary of the Department of the Labor and Employment, native of Lubao, Pampanga.
 Pedro Tongio Liongson – lawyer, judge, and politician; born on January 31, 1865, in Villa de Bacolor, Pampanga.
 Eddie Panlilio – born in Minalin, Pampanga, was the first Filipino priest to be elected governor in Philippine history.
 Satur Ocampo - politician, activist, journalist, and writer. Former  Member of the Philippine House of Representatives for Bayan Muna Partylist
 Oscar Albayalde – A police officer, former chief of the Philippine National Police and former director of the National Capital Police Office, born in San Fernando.
Mercedes Arrastia-Tuason – Philippine diplomat and former ambassador to the Holy See

Culinary Arts

Lucia Cunanan – restaurateur best known for having invented or at least re-invented sisig, a popular Kapampangan dish in the Philippines and Filipino diasporas worldwide.
Larry Cruz – restaurateur who founded the LJC Restaurant Group, which operates several restaurants in the Philippines. Among the restaurants in the said group include Café Adriatico, Cafe Havana, Bistro Remedios, and Abe, which was named after his father, the writer E. Aguilar Cruz.

Journalism and Media

Amando G. Dayrit – pre-war columnist and journalist
 Orly Punzalan – a veteran radio-TV broadcaster and former president of Intercontinental Broadcasting Corporation (IBC-13), born and raised in Apalit.
 Kristine Johnson – Filipino-American co-anchor at WCBS-TV, born in Clark Air Base.

Ivan Mayrina – broadcaster, journalist, reporter and news anchor.

Literature and arts

 Aurelio Tolentino – original member of the Katipunan and nationalist playwright, born in Guagua.
 Vicente Manansala – National Artist of the Philippines for Visual Arts – Painting, native of Macabebe.
 Angela Manalang-Gloria - pioneer Filipina poet who wrote in English, born in Guagua.
 Zoilo Galang - credited as one of the pioneering Filipino writers who worked with the English language. He is the author of the first Philippine novel written in the English language, A Child of Sorrow, published in 1921.
 Galo Ocampo – modernist painter
 Francisco Alonso Liongson – playwright. Born on July 1, 1896, in Villa de Bacolor, Pampanga.
Norma Belleza – painter
 Danton Remoto – writer

Sciences
 Alfredo C. Santos – National Scientist of the Philippines for Physical Chemistry, from Santo Tomas, Pampanga
 Randy David – sociologist, and public intellectual

Religious leaders
Francisco Baluyot – born in Guagua, Pampanga broke barriers by becoming the 1st known indio priest, who, upon ordination in 1698, was assigned to the archdiocese of Cebu.
 Rufino Jiao Santos – born in Guagua, Pampanga, Archbishop of Manila from 1953 to 1973. The first Filipino Cardinal.
 Pedro Paulo Santos – born in Porac, Pampanga, First Parish Priest of Calulut, assigned as Parish Priest of Angeles City, appointed as bishop of Nueva Caceres in 1938 then as its first archbishop on 1951.
 Eliseo Soriano – televangelist of Ang Dating Daan and the Over-all Servant of Members Church of God International which its main headquarters is located in Apalit, Pampanga.
 Florentino Lavarias – born in Mabalacat, Pampanga, Archbishop of Roman Catholic Archdiocese of San Fernando and  formerly the fourth Bishop of the Diocese of Iba, Zambales
 Honesto Ongtioco – born in San Fernando, Pampanga, bishop of Balanga from June 18, 1998, to August 28, 2003, and Cubao since August 28, 2003.
 Paciano Aniceto – born in Santa Ana, Pampanga, Archbishop Emeritus Roman Catholic Archdiocese of San Fernando and former second Bishop of the Diocese of Iba, Zambales
 Roberto Mallari – born in Macabebe, Pampanga, Bishop of Roman Catholic Diocese of San Jose in Nueva Ecija 
 Pablo Virgilio David – born in Betis, Pampanga, Bishop of Roman Catholic Diocese of Kalookan 
 Victor Ocampo – born in Angeles, Pampanga, Bishop of Roman Catholic Diocese of Gumaca
 Crisostomo Yalung – born in Angeles, Pampanga, Bishop Emeritus of Roman Catholic Diocese of Antipolo, Retired in 2002

Entertainment
 Jaime dela Rosa – a matinee idol in the 1950s of Lubao, Pampanga.
 Brillante Mendoza – Filipino film director from San Fernando, Pampanga.
 Jason Paul Laxamana – Filipino film director and writer
 Petersen Vargas – Filipino film director and writer
 Lea Salonga – singer and actress, spent the first six years of her childhood in Angeles before moving to Manila.
 Pepe Smith – singer and member of Juan de la Cruz Band
 Sheena Halili – model and actress from San Fernando.
 Vanessa Minnillo – American television personality born in Clark Air Base, Angeles, and raised in the US.
 Allan Pineda Lindo, also known as apl.de.ap – founding member of The Black Eyed Peas, born in Sapang Bato, Angeles.
 Donita Rose – Filipino-American actress, lived in Angeles City for a few years.
 Kelsey Merritt – Filipino-American model best known for being the first woman of Filipino descent to walk in the Victoria's Secret Fashion Show and to appear in the pages of the Sports Illustrated Swimsuit Issue.
 Ritz Azul - dramatic actress.
 Baron Geisler - actor.
 Hermes Bautista - actor.

Pageantry
 Melanie Marquez – crowned Miss International 1979.
 Abbygale Arenas - crowned Binibining Pilipinas - Universe 1997.
 Carla Balingit - crowned Binibining Pilipinas - Universe 2003.
 Laura Marie Dunlap - crowned Miss Philippines Earth 2003.
 Angela Fernando - crowned Miss Eco Tourism Philippines 2010
 Ann Colis – crowned Miss Globe 2015.
 Nichole Marie Manalo - crowned Binibining Pilipinas - Globe 2016.
 Emma Tiglao – crowned Binibining Pilipinas - Intercontinental 2019.
 Michelle Dee – crowned Miss World Philippines 2019.
 Cyrille Payumo – crowned Miss Tourism International 2019.
 Francesca Taruc - crowned Miss Tourism World Intercontinental 2019

Sports
 Ato Agustin – Filipino professional basketball player and coach, from Lubao, Pampanga.
 Victonara Galang – Filipino volleyball athlete from Angeles.
 Efren "Bata" Reyes – billiards player from Angeles.
 Jayson Castro William – Filipino  professional basketball player from Guagua, Pampanga.
 Japeth Aguilar – Filipino professional basketball player from Sasmuan, Pampanga.
 Arwind Santos – Filipino professional basketball player from Lubao, Pampanga.
 Calvin Abueva – Filipino professional basketball player from Angeles.
 Diana Mae Carlos – Filipino volleyball athlete from Lubao, Pampanga.
 Mary Remy Joy Palma – Filipino volleyball athlete from Apalit, Pampanga
 Michael Sudaria – Filipino volleyball athlete.

Others

References

External links

 
 
 
Local Governance Performance Management System

 
Provinces of the Philippines
Provinces of Central Luzon
States and territories established in 1571
1571 establishments in the Philippines